Switch London is a DAB ensemble operated by Switchdigital; it broadcasts from a variety of sites in and around London (Alexandra Palace, Arkley, Bluebell Hill, BT Tower, Colindale House, Crystal Palace, Guildford, Hampstead, Harrow Weald, Hemel Hempstead, Leatherhead Stoke d'Abernon, Mount Vernon, Otford, Reigate, Richmond Hill, Shepherds Bush, Shooters Hill, Sidcup, Staines, Uxbridge and Zouches Farm). It has been on air since July 2000. It is also referred to as the Greater London 2 multiplex. In their application to the Radio Authority, Switch proposed using Brookmans Park as a transmission site in its SFN, but this has not yet been implemented.

In 2010, the Otford relay site was replaced by the much more powerful Wrotham site in Kent which broadcasts at 5 kW.

Stations carried

References

See also
DRG London
CE London

Radio stations in London
Digital audio broadcasting multiplexes